Jeff Ward may refer to:

 Jeff Ward (actor), American actor
 Jeff Ward (motorsports) (born 1961), motocross rider and racing driver
 Jeff Ward (musician) (1962–1993), drummer

See also
 Geoff Ward (disambiguation)